Pedro Zarraluki (born 1954) is a Spanish writer. He was born in Barcelona. He published his first book at the age of 20 and has written several novels and short story collections since then. He has won numerous prizes, including the Premio Nadal for his novel Un encargo difícil, and the Premio Herralde for La historia del silencio. The latter was translated into English by Nick Caistor. 

Zarraluki is a regular contributor to the press and radio, and teaches creative writing at the Ateneo Barcelonés.

References

Spanish male writers
1954 births
Living people